The General Assembly (Spanish: Juntas Generales; Basque: Batzar Nagusiak) is the name of the legislative body (legislature) of the territories of Biscay, Gipuzkoa, Alava and Navarre, and the elected assemblies to which the Government of each territory is responsible.

The legislatures are as follows:

 General Assembly of Biscay (in Biscay): composed of fifty-one deputies. The head of the legislature is the speaker of the General Assembly of Biscay. The assembly elects the head of the government (called "General Deputy of Biscay") and he or she appoints their ministers (called "Foral Deputies"). The Foral Government (called "Foral Deputation of Biscay") is responsible to the General Assembly.
 General Assembly of Gipuzkoa (in Gipuzkoa): composed of fifty-one deputies. The head of the legislature is the speaker of the General Assembly of Gipuzkoa. The assembly elects the head of the government (called "General Deputy of Gipuzkoa") and he or she appoints their ministers (called "Foral Deputies").The Foral Government (called "Foral Deputation of Gipuzkoa") is responsible to the General Assembly.
 General Assembly of Álava (in Álava): composed of fifty-one deputies. The head of the legislature is the speaker of the General Assembly of Álava. The assembly elects the head of the government (called "General Deputy of Álava") and he or she appoints their ministers (called "Foral Deputies").The Foral Government (called "Foral Deputation of Álava") is responsible to the General Assembly.
 Parliament of Navarre (in Navarre): composed of fifty deputies. The head of the legislature is the speaker of the Parliament of Navarre.

This legislative bodies go back to the 14th century. They were part of an early form of democratic institutions. At the local level, the heads of households (male or female) would meet on Sundays after church at the church door in a meeting called elizate (or anteiglesia in Spanish) to debate and decide on local issues. An elizate in turn would elect someone to represent the local community at the assembly (juntas), which existed from the district level right up to the General Assemebly (Juntas Generales).

Historical development
Little is known about the historical background of these local and regional institutions prior to the 14th century. Broadly speaking, two historical periods can be distinguished:
The period from the 14th century to 1876 when the Juntas Generales were abolished
The period from 1979 to the present when the Juntas Generales were reinstated.

After the First Carlist War, the fueros were much weakened and eventually fully abolished after the Third Carlist War in 1876. Although the Spanish Government of the time established the conciertos económicos involving low taxes, protective tariffs and self-collection of taxes, Madrid demolished Basque institutions including the Juntas Generales.

Following the Spanish transition to democracy in the 1970s the Statute of Autonomy of the Basque Country re-instated the Juntas Generales in Biscay, Gipuzkoa and Álava in 1979.

Parliament of Navarre 
Unlike the other Basque provinces, Navarre had evolved into the Kingdom of Navarre and had developed to a large extent feudal traditions and institutions in line with other European kingdoms of the time. As a result, it was largely excluded from the development of such early democratic institutions. However, the royal authority was but one layer of the governmental institutions, and the latter—diputacion or government council, "The Three States" (Cortes)—were based on the Navarrese charters stemming from similar values, traditions and institutions to the other Basque regions.

It did have a charter however, the 1841 Ley Paccionada de Fueros which Navarre managed to protect when the fueros of Biscay, Gipuzkoa and Álava were abolished in 1879.

General Assembly of Gipuzkoa 
 General Assembly of Gipuzkoa

General Assembly of Biscay 

Both historically and currently, the Juntas Generales of Biscay are based in Gernika-Lumo, at the famous Casa de Juntas. Prior to the abolition of the foral laws and the Juntas Generales of Biscay, the Basque señoríos met under the Oak of Gernika to swear they would respect the ancient laws of Biscay.

Of all historical Juntas Generales, this is perhaps the most widely known and important one as it was in Gernika the Spanish monarchs were required to swear to uphold the Basque freedoms since the incorporation of Biscay and Gipuzkoa into the Kingdom of Castile from 1200 onwards.

The modern era
The modern Juntas Generales of Biscay were re-instated in 1979 and form a unicameral assembly. Its 51 (90 in 1979 only) members, the batzarkideak (in Basque) or apoderados (in Spanish), are elected by the people of Biscay every four years alongside the municipal elections.

Their duties are to:
 form the Provincial Government of Biscay (the Diputación Foral de Vizcaya (Spanish)/Bizkaiko Foru Aldundia (Basque)
 to elect a president
 to develop the foral laws of Biscay
 to administer the province's budget

The party political composition since 1979 has been as follows:

1Since the 1995 elections the EE has been part of the PSE (PSOE).

The lehendakari of the Juntas Generales of Biscay has hailed from the Basque Nationalist Party (PNV) since 1987:

General Assembly of Álava/Araba 
Is the Representative Assambly of Álava. It has 51 representatives. The Lehendakari is Ramiro Gonzalez from EAJ-PNV, with 13 representatives. The leader of the Opposition is Marta Alaña from PP. The next parties with deputies are EH Bildu, Podemos, PSE-EE, Irabazi and Ciudadanos.

Other Lehendakaris were Fernando Buesa (PSE-EE), Ramon Rabanera and Javier de Andres (PP) and Xabier Aguirre (EAJ-PNV).

French Basque Country
While they were overall less widely known due to the northern districts—Labourd, Lower Navarre, Soule—falling behind in terms of economic development, they also had assemblies that were largely independent of those of the French state and held charters - the fors, the northern equivalent of the fueros. Their powers and sovereignty were gradually curtailed by the French Crown, notably in 1620 and 1659-1660 following the Treaty of the Pyrenees, but remained in place and relevant (e.g. the Biltzar of Labourd) about decisions affecting regional life until the Napoleonic period (1790).

See also

Basque señoríos
Basque and Pyrenean fueros
Custom (law)
Elizate
History of the Basque people

References

External links
Juntas Generales de Álava
Juntas Generales de Guipúzcoa
Juntas Generales de Vizcaya

Basque culture
Basque history
Politics of Spain